Anna Bjørke Kallestad (born 23 May 1996) is a Norwegian handball player.

She represented Norway in the 2016 Women's Junior World Handball Championship, placing 5th, at the 2015 Women's Under-19 European Handball Championship, placing 6th and at the 2014 Women's Youth World Handball Championship, placing 13th.

Achievements
Norwegian League
Bronze Medalist: 2019/2020

Individual awards
 All-Star Right Back of Eliteserien: 2019/2020

References

1996 births
Living people
Norwegian female handball players
21st-century Norwegian women